Stuart Robertson is an American visual effects artist. He won an Academy Award in the category Best Visual Effects for the film What Dreams May Come.

Selected filmography 
 What Dreams May Come (1998; co-won with Joel Hynek, Nicholas Brooks and Kevin Mack)

References

External links 

Living people
Place of birth missing (living people)
Year of birth missing (living people)
Visual effects artists
Visual effects supervisors
Best Visual Effects Academy Award winners